Evant High School is a public high school located in Evant, Texas (USA) and classified as a 1A school by the UIL.  It is part of the Evant Independent School District located in northwest Coryell County.  In 2015, the school was rated "Met Standard" by the Texas Education Agency.

Athletics
The Evant Elks compete in these sports - 

Basketball
Cross Country
6-Man Football
Track and Field
Volleyball

Notable Alumnus
Jimmie Keeling - Former head football coach at Hardin–Simmons University in Abilene, Texas.

References

External links
Evant ISD

Schools in Coryell County, Texas
Public high schools in Texas
Public middle schools in Texas